Canned Laughter may refer to:

 Canned laughter, or laugh track, a separate soundtrack for a recorded comedy show containing the sound of audience laughter
 Canned Laughter, a comedy album by The Bob & Tom Show
 Canned Laughter (TV programme), a 1979 British one-off comedy television programme featuring Rowan Atkinson that aired on ITV